Neighborhood Watch is the third album from West Coast hip hop group Dilated Peoples and was released in 2004. The album was not as acclaimed as their past releases, The Platform and Expansion Team, and was not able to push a significant number of units, despite having the group's first Billboard Hot 100 hit in the Kanye West-assisted "This Way". The album also features the singles "Marathon" and "Poisonous", as well as the DJ showcase "DJ Babu in Deep Concentration", an ode to Gang Starr's 1989 track "DJ Premier in Deep Concentration". "Who's Who" was used in two video games SSX 3 and Need for Speed: Underground.

Track listing

Samples
Marathon
"Come Back Home" by Rudy Love & the Love Family
"Eric B. Is President" by Eric B. & Rakim
Neighborhood Watch
"Night Games" by Bobby Bland
Tryin' to Breathe
"It Ain't Rainin' (On Nobody's House but Mine)" by The Dramatics
Who's Who
"Funk to the Folks" by The Soul Searchers
"Can't Find the Judge" by Gary Wright
"Ironside" by Quincy Jones
Reach Us
"Palikari Dipsasmeno" by Stavros Xarchakos
Love and War
"I Can't Fake It Anymore" by Ted Taylor
"Feel the Heartbeat" by The Treacherous Three
World on Wheels
"The Lovomaniacs" by Boobie Knight & the Universal Lady
Closed Session
Pack of Lies" by The Counts
This Way
"Old Men" by Jimmie and Vella
"Live Convention '82 (Side A)" by DJ Grand Wizard Theodore
DJ Babu in Deep Concentration
"Stoop Rap" from Wild Style
"Marley Marl Scratch" by Marley Marl
"I Ain't No Joke" by Eric B. & Rakim
"Funky Stuff" by Kool & the Gang
"Change the Beat (Female Version)" by Beside
"Summertime" by Billy Stewart

Album singles

Charts

References

2004 albums
Dilated Peoples albums
Albums produced by Kanye West
Albums produced by Evidence (musician)
Albums produced by the Alchemist (musician)
Capitol Records albums